Gooney Bird Greene (2002) is the first of a series of children's novels by Lois Lowry concerning the storytelling abilities of a second-grade girl. It was illustrated by Middy Thomas.

Plot
Gooney Bird Greene has just transferred to Mrs. Pidgeon's second grade class in Watertower. She is unusually self-confident, likes to be the center of attention, and has an eccentric flair for style, and an exciting, almost magical past. When Mrs. Pidgeon suggests storytelling lessons, the class demands, instead of well-worn Christopher Columbus, Gooney Bird as the main character of the story.

So begins Gooney Bird's series of autobiographical tales, outlandish in theme but "only absolutely true": "How Gooney Bird Got Her Name","How Gooney Bird Came from China on a Flying Carpet", "The Prince, the Palace, and the Diamond Earrings", "Why Gooney Bird Was Late for School Because She Was Directing a Symphony Orchestra", and "Beloved Catman Is Consumed by a Cow". Along the way, the class learns not just about Gooney Bird, but how to tell a story, and how everyone has a story to tell.

Reception
Reviews of Gooney Bird Greene were generally positive. Though Publishers Weekly viewed Gooney Bird's precocious storytelling skills with some skepticism, it wrote that her eccentric behavior and stories were entertaining, particularly to child readers. Kirkus Reviews praised the book's illustration and design choices, and described the titular second-grader's tales as "clever", noting that the book was a good instrument for teaching writing and storytelling.

References

2002 American novels
2002 children's books
American children's novels
Books about birds
Novels set in elementary and primary schools
Novels by Lois Lowry